Marcus William Dinwiddie (August 27, 1906 – March 20, 1951) was an American sport shooter who competed in the 1924 Summer Olympics. In 1924 he won the silver medal 50 metre rifle, standing in the team free rifle competition. He was born in Washington, D. C. and died in Oak Ridge, Tennessee.

References

External links
Marcus Dinwiddie's profile at databaseOlympics

1906 births
1951 deaths
American male sport shooters
United States Distinguished Marksman
ISSF pistol shooters
Shooters at the 1924 Summer Olympics
Olympic silver medalists for the United States in shooting
Medalists at the 1924 Summer Olympics